Pollenia ponti is a species of cluster fly in the family Polleniidae.

Distribution
Italy, Morocco, Portugal, Slovakia, Spain, Ukraine.

References

Polleniidae
Insects described in 1991
Diptera of Europe
Diptera of Africa